Quirino Mendoza y Cortés (May 10, 1862 – 1957) was a Mexican composer of the famous traditional songs "Cielito Lindo" and "Jesusita en Chihuahua". He was born in Santiago Tulyehualco, Xochimilco, Mexico City in 1862.

Early life 
Cortés' father was an organist at a local parish, which originally inspired him to learn music. During his teens, he learned to play the piano, flute, violin, guitar, and the organ. He learned very quickly while taking lessons from his father, and quickly mastered these instruments in his teens. Also in his teens, he played songs at the local parish on the organ, like his father did. He then began to write his first song, 'My Blessed God.'

References

1862 births
1957 deaths
Mexican composers of popular or traditional folk music
People from Mexico City